Anton Heida (born 24 December 1878, date of death unknown) was an American gymnast who competed in the 1904 Summer Olympics, where he won five gold medals. He won the vault, horizontal bar, pommel horse, team competition and all-around titles, becoming the most successful athlete at the 1904 Olympics.

See also
List of multiple Olympic gold medalists
List of multiple Olympic gold medalists at a single Games

References

1878 births
Year of death missing
American male artistic gymnasts
Gymnasts at the 1904 Summer Olympics
Olympic gold medalists for the United States in gymnastics
Olympic silver medalists for the United States in gymnastics
Gymnasts from Prague
Medalists at the 1904 Summer Olympics
20th-century American people
Austro-Hungarian emigrants to the United States